Jagannath Prasad Swatantra is an Indian politician. He was elected to the Lok Sabha, the lower house of the Parliament of India from  Bagaha in Bihar as a member of the Janata party.

References

External links
Official biographical sketch in Parliament of India website

Janata Party politicians
India MPs 1977–1979
Lok Sabha members from Bihar
1921 births
Possibly living people
Bihar MLAs 1952–1957
Bihar MLAs 1957–1962
Bihar MLAs 1962–1967